Ex-Files 2 is a 2015 romantic comedy film directed by Tian Yusheng. A China-Hong Kong co-production, the film is a sequel to the 2014 film Ex-Files. It was released in China on November 6, 2015. A sequel titled The Ex-File 3: The Return of the Exes was released on December 29, 2017.

Cast
Zheng Kai
Amber Kuo
Wang Chuanjun
Zhang Dianlun
Lay Zhang

Reception

References

2015 romantic comedy films
Chinese romantic comedy films
Hong Kong romantic comedy films
Huayi Brothers films
Chinese sequel films
2010s Hong Kong films